Benjamin Cleveland (May 28, 1738 – October 1806) was an American pioneer and officer in the North Carolina militia. He is best remembered for his service as a colonel in the Wilkes County Regiment of the North Carolina militia during the War of Independence, and in particular for his role in the American victory at the Battle of Kings Mountain .

Personal life and career
Benjamin Cleveland was born in Orange County, Virginia, the fourth child of John and Elizabeth [nee Coffee] Cleveland, and was of English descent and Irish descent. He moved to the area which would become Wilkes County, North Carolina in 1769.  There, Cleveland built his estate, "Roundabout," near what is today Ronda, North Carolina.  He was noted in the early history of Wilkes County, and is known to have worked as a hunter, trapper, farmer, carpenter, and surveyor.   By the time of the American Revolution, Cleveland was the wealthiest and most prominent citizen in the county.  A large, heavyset man – around six feet tall and weighing over 300 lbs in his prime – he was called "Old Roundabout.

Cleveland married Mary Graves, a sister of Susannah Graves, the wife of Revolutionary War patriot and frontiersman, General Joseph Martin (for whom Martinsville, Virginia, is named.)

Cleveland was elected to the North Carolina House of Commons in 1778 and to the North Carolina Senate in 1779 and 1780.

Revolutionary War
Military service record:
 Lieutenant in the Surry County Regiment of militia (1775-1776)
 Captain in the Surry County Regiment of militia (1776-1777)
 Captain in the 2nd Battalion of Volunteers (1776-1777) 
 Colonel over the Wilkes County Regiment of militia (1777-1782)

Cleveland was commissioned a lieutenant in 1775 and as a colonel in 1777 in the North Carolina militia.  Until Lord Cornwallis invaded in 1780, the fighting in North Carolina consisted of guerrilla warfare between patriots ("Whigs") and "Tories".  Cleveland became known as the "Terror of the Tories" for his treatment of Loyalists.  In 1779, two Tories looted the home of George Wilfong, a patriot and friend of Cleveland. The Tories used Wilfong's clothes line to chase away his horses. The marauders were captured by Cleveland's men, who had them hanged using the clothes line they had stolen.  In revenge, a group of Tories led by Captain William Riddle kidnapped Cleveland.  Cleveland's men rescued him and captured Riddle and two others.  All three were hanged from the same tree, which became known as the "Tory Oak," and was for years an historic landmark behind the old Wilkes County courthouse (now the Wilkes Historical Museum).

Kings Mountain

In 1780, General Lord Cornwallis led a British army into the Carolinas, and won several victories over the patriots.  Major Patrick Ferguson, one of Cornwallis's commanders, led an army of Tories into the North Carolina mountains to crush the rebels there.  A large force of mountain men attacked Ferguson at Kings Pinnacle, an isolated ridge on the North Carolina-South Carolina border.

Cleveland played a key role in the ensuing Battle of Kings Mountain.  According to legend, Cleveland climbed up Rendezvous Mountain and blew his horn to summon some 200 Wilkes County militiamen.  He led them into battle. Cleveland's horse was shot from under him, and Major Ferguson was himself killed in the battle. Cleveland's brother, Robert, is said to have rallied the militiamen during the heat of the battle, contributing to the patriot victory.  Cleveland claimed Ferguson's white stallion as a "war prize", and rode it home to his estate of Roundabout.

Later years
After the war, Cleveland moved to the South Carolina frontier and was a commissioner in the Pendleton District.

He died at his home in Oconee County, South Carolina in 1806 of heart dropsy.  An obelisk monument to him stands on private property just north of U.S. Route 123 about 160 yds (145 m) east of the Madison Baptist Church in the Madison Community of Oconee County. He was buried about 1 mi (1.6 km) away in a private cemetery.

Legacy
Cleveland County, North Carolina and Cleveland, Tennessee are named in his honor.

A historical marker dedicated to Cleveland reads: "Colonel in Revolution, Whig leader in battle of Kings Mountain, state legislator. Home was on 'The Round About,' one mile southwest."

First historically accurate depiction and statue
In 2012, artist Don Troiani completed the first historically accurate depiction of Benjamin Cleveland, titled "Benjamin Cleveland's War Prize."  Troiani teamed with experts from across the nation to ensure accuracy. The project was funded by local businessman and philanthropist Allan Jones. The painting features a victorious Cleveland leading his troops back home to Wilkes County on Ferguson's white stallion.

The research that contributed to the Don Troiani painting was used to create a 500-pound bronze statue of Colonel Benjamin Cleveland.  On April 19, 2013, the statue of Cleveland, sculpted by local Cleveland, Tennessee artist, Joshua Coleman, was erected in Patriots Park in Cleveland. The statue was funded by the Colonel Benjamin Cleveland Chapter of the Tennessee Society of the Sons of the American Revolution.

See also

Robert Cleveland Log House

References

External links
 USGenWeb Cleveland Cemetery and Benjamin Cleveland's will
 
 Col. Benjamin Cleveland Chapter of the Sons of the American Revolution

1738 births
1806 deaths
Oconee County, South Carolina
North Carolina militiamen in the American Revolution
Members of the North Carolina House of Representatives
North Carolina state senators
American people of English descent
American people of Irish descent
People from Wilkes County, North Carolina